Zlata Filipović (born 3 December 1980) is a Bosnian-Irish diarist. She kept a diary from 1991 to 1993 when she was a child helping in Sarajevo during the Bosnian War.

She and her family survived the war and moved to Paris where they lived for a year.

Biography

The only child of an advocate and a chemist, Filipović grew up in a middle-class family. From 1991 to 1993, she wrote in her diary, Mimmy, about the horrors of the siege of Sarajevo during the Bosnian War, through which she lived.

Filipović and her family survived and escaped to Paris, in 1993 where they stayed for a year. She attended St. Andrew's College, Dublin (a senior school), going on to graduate from the University of Oxford in 2001 with a BA in human sciences, and has lived in Dublin, Ireland since October 1995, where she studied at Trinity College Dublin.
Filipović has continued to write. She wrote the foreword to The Freedom Writers Diary and co-edited Stolen Voices: Young People's War Diaries, From World War I to Iraq. She appeared on the Canadian version of the talk show Tout le monde en parle on 19 November 2006. As of 2016 she lived in Dublin, Ireland, working in the field of documentary and other film production.

Works

Activism

In 2011, Filipović produced the short film Stand Up! for the Stand Up! campaign created by BeLonG To, an LGBTQ youth service organisation in Ireland against homophobic bullying in schools. It has been viewed over 1.6 million times on YouTube.

Filipović served on the Executive Committee of Amnesty International Ireland (2007–13) and is a founding member of NYPAW (Network of Young People Affected by War). She has spoken extensively at schools and universities around the world on issues of children in conflict. She was a member of the UNESCO Jury for the Prize for Children and Young People's Literature for Tolerance, and is a recipient of the Child of Courage Award by the Simon Wiesenthal Centre in Los Angeles (1994).

Production

Short
2011: Stand up 
2012: Motion Sickness 
2013: Abacus 
2014: Stand up for your friends 
2016: OCD and Me 
2016: The Wake 
2017: James Vincent McMorrow: One Thousand Times 
2017: Bittersweet (documentary)
2018: Johnny (documentary)
2018: Villagers - Fool 
2019: Strong at the Broken Places
2020: How to 69

Documentary
2010: Blood of the Irish
2011: Hold on Tight 
2012: Three Men Go to War 
2013: Here Was Cuba 
2014: Somebody to love 
2016: The Farthest 
2016: The Story of Yes

Television
2017: The Babymakers (series documentary)
2018: The Game: The Story of Hurling (series documentary)

References

External links
 
Interview with Zlata Filipovic, motherdaughterbookclub.com, February 2010; accessed 7 March 2016.
Zlata Filipović interview on the Charlie Rose show, 7 March 1994
Le Journal De Zlata from Zone Libre, radio-canada.ca, 19 December 2003. 

1980 births
Writers from Sarajevo
Living people
Women diarists
People of the Bosnian War
Women in European warfare
Women in warfare post-1945
20th-century Bosnia and Herzegovina women
21st-century Bosnia and Herzegovina writers
21st-century Bosnia and Herzegovina women writers
Alumni of the University of Oxford
People educated at St Andrew's College, Dublin